In stochastic calculus, the Doléans-Dade exponential or stochastic exponential of a semimartingale X is the unique strong solution of the stochastic differential equation where  denotes the process of left limits, i.e., .

The concept is named after Catherine Doléans-Dade.

Notation and terminology 

General formula and special cases 

 If  is continuous, then In particular, if  is a Brownian motion, then the Doléans-Dade exponential is a geometric Brownian motion. 
 If  is continuous and of finite variation, then Here  need not be differentiable with respect to time; for example,  can be the Cantor function.

Properties 

 Stochastic exponential cannot go to zero continuously, it can only jump to zero. Hence, the stochastic exponential of a continuous semimartingale is always strictly positive. 
 Once  has jumped to zero, it is absorbed in zero. The first time it jumps to zero is precisely the first time when . 
For this reason one must write  and not .
 Natural exponential of a semimartingale can always be written as a stochastic exponential of another semimartingale but not the other way around.
 Stochastic exponential of a local martingale is again a local martingale.
 All the formulae and properties above apply also to stochastic exponential of a complex-valued . This has application in the theory of conformal martingales and in the calculation of characteristic functions.

Useful identities 
Yor's formula: for any two semimartingales  and  one has

Applications 

 Stochastic exponential of a local martingale appears  in the statement of Girsanov theorem. Criteria to ensure that the stochastic exponential  of a continuous local martingale  is a martingale are given by Kazamaki's condition, Novikov's condition, and Beneš's condition.

Derivation of the explicit formula for continuous semimartingales 
For any continuous semimartingale X, take for granted that  is continuous and strictly positive. Then applying Itō's formula with   gives

Exponentiating with  gives the solution

This differs from what might be expected by comparison with the case where X has finite variation due to the existence of the quadratic variation term  [X] in the solution.

See also 
 Stochastic logarithm

References 

 

Martingale theory
Stochastic differential equations